Elizabeth O'Neill (179129 October 1872), also Eliza, was an Irish actress.

Biography

Born in Drogheda, she was the daughter of an actor and stage manager. Her first appearance on the stage was made at the Crow Street Theatre in 1811 as the Widow Cheerly in Andrew Cherry's The Soldier's Daughter, and after several years in Ireland she came to London and made an immediate success as Juliet at Covent Garden in 1814.  For five years she was the favorite of London town in comedy as well as tragedy, but in the latter she particularly excelled, being frequently compared, not to her disadvantage, with the great Sarah Siddons.

In 1819 she married William Wrixon Becher of Ballygiblin Castle
, an Irish M.P., who was to be created a baronet in 1831. After her marriage, she never returned to the stage.

Selected roles
 Adelgitha in Adelgitha by Matthew Lewis (1817)
 Zimra in Retribution by John Dillon (1818)
 Urilda in Fredolfo by Charles Maturin (1819)
 Evadne in Evadne by Richard Sheil (1819)

See also
List of entertainers who married titled Britishers

References

Further reading

External links

 Eliza O'Neill in Actors and Actresses of Great Britain and the United States, Volume 2, edited by Brander Matthews, Laurence Hutton
 Eliza O'Neill in Bow Bells, by J. Dicks
 Eliza O'Neill in The Autographic Mirror, Volume 3
 Beecher, Lady Wrixon nee Eliza O'Neill in Appletons' Annual Cyclopaedia and Register of Important Events: Embracing ...
 Miss O'Neill (Lady Wrixon Beecher) in Illustrious Irishwomen: Being Memoirs of Some of the Most Noted ..., Volume 1, by Elizabeth Casey
 Eliza O'Neill at historyswomen.com

Irish stage actresses
1791 births
1872 deaths
19th-century Irish actresses
People from Drogheda
Wives of baronets
Women of the Regency era